Axell is a surname. Notable people with the surname include:

 Axell Hodges (born 1996), motocross and X Games competitor
 Bert Axell (1915–2001), British naturalist and conservationist
 Evelyne Axell (1935–1972), Belgian painter
 Suzanne Axell (born 1955), Swedish journalist and television presenter